Mehl (German for "flour") is a German and Norwegian surname. Notable people with the surname include:

B. Max Mehl (1884–1957), American dealer in coins
Eberhard Mehl (1935–2002), German fencer
Emilie Enger Mehl (born 1993), Norwegian politician
Fenito Mehl (born 1997), South African cricketer
Gabriele Mehl (born 1967), German rower
Jeppe Mehl (born 1986), Danish footballer
Lance Mehl (born 1958), American professional football player
Lewis Mehl-Madrona, American professor and writer
Maurice Mehl (1887–1966), American paleontologist
Michael Mehl (born 1999), Canadian professional squash player and coach
Paul Mehl (1912–1972), German international footballer
Robert Franklin Mehl (1898–1976), American metallurgist
Ronald D. Mehl (1944–2003), American pastor
Timmy Mehl (born 1995), American professional soccer player

Other 
French destroyer Capitaine Mehl
Mehl-Mülhens-Rennen, a horse race in Germany
Meinolf Mehls (born 1965), retired German football midfielder
Myanma Economic Holdings Limited

Occupational surnames